Donald Knott (born 11 April 1963) is a South African cricketer. He played in four List A matches for Border in 1988/89 and 1992/93.

See also
 List of Border representative cricketers

References

External links
 

1963 births
Living people
South African cricketers
Border cricketers
Cricketers from East London, Eastern Cape